Irina Cristiana Carreira Rodrigues (born 5 February 1991) is a Portuguese athlete specializing in the discus throw. She competed for Portugal at the 2012 Summer Olympics without reaching the final.

Competition record

References

Portuguese female discus throwers
Athletes (track and field) at the 2012 Summer Olympics
Athletes (track and field) at the 2016 Summer Olympics
Olympic athletes of Portugal
1991 births
Living people
World Athletics Championships athletes for Portugal
People from Leiria
Athletes (track and field) at the 2018 Mediterranean Games
Competitors at the 2011 Summer Universiade
Mediterranean Games competitors for Portugal
Athletes (track and field) at the 2020 Summer Olympics
Sportspeople from Leiria District